Diego García (born September 15, 1979) is an Argentine professional basketball player. He currently plays for Club La Unión in Argentina.  He is also a member of the Argentina national basketball team.

National team career
Garcia is also a long-time member of the Argentine national basketball team.  He participated with the team at the 2006 and 2008 South American Championships.  In his most recent appearance with the national team, he averaged 2.5 points per game while seeing action in all ten of Argentina's games FIBA Americas Championship 2009.

References

1979 births
Living people
Argentine expatriate basketball people in Spain
Argentine men's basketball players
Basketball players at the 2007 Pan American Games
Ben Hur basketball players
CB Valladolid players
Estudiantes de Olavarría basketball players
La Unión basketball players
Libertad de Sunchales basketball players
Liga ACB players
Pan American Games competitors for Argentina
Quimsa basketball players
Shooting guards
Sportspeople from Santa Fe, Argentina